Ethel Jackson Morris (1891–1985) was an Australian illustrator.

Life
Morris was born in 1891, the daughter of James Jackson Morris of Victoria. She had at least two brothers who both fought in the First world war and returned home to work in the family business. Her family was well to do and owned several properties including a successful jersey cattle stud at Clarendon Eyre named after the family home in Malvern, and a property in Bulleen near the Yarra River. With her family's support Jackson Morris attended the National Gallery School Art School, Melbourne from 1910 until 1920. During that time she illustrated works and exhibited with the Victorian Artists' Society. She worked alongside artists such as Harold Gaze and Ethel Spowers. She published her first book for children in 1909 when she was just 17. In 1915 she contributed work to Dame Nellie Melba’s book of Australian art and literature. Her second book was released in 1921 and critically received. The same year she also held a solo exhibition at the Fine Art Society's Gallery.

In 1922 Jackson Morris travelled to Europe and studied in the Royal Academy of Art and visited Paris. It is believed this is when she met her future husband. She returned home and in 1923 settled in Sydney where in 1930 she married Captain John Overton.There is no further information about her life after she married.

Bibliography
 All Among the Fairies (1909) 
 The White Butterfly (1921)

References

Sources
 
 
 
 
 
 
 
 
 
 
 
 
 
 

1891 births
1985 deaths
20th-century Australian painters
Australian women painters
20th-century Australian women artists
Artists from Melbourne